Huang Yi-tang, better known as Maple, is a Taiwanese professional League of Legends player for Team SoloMid, of the League Championship Series (LCS). 

Huang found success domestically and internationally during his time as a member of the Flash Wolves, winning several LMS titles and topping many international events. He has long been considered by many analysts and other professional players as one of the most mechanically skillful players from Taiwan. Huang also played for LPL teams Suning and LNG Esports.

Career 
Due to their first-place finish at IEM Taipei, yoe Flash Wolves were invited to compete at the IEM Season IX - World Championship. After a Round 1 loss against SK Gaming, Maple and the team went on to beat Cloud9 in Round 1 of the losers bracket. Round 2 of the losers bracket saw the team's 2nd meeting of the tournament with SK Gaming. A win against the European team secured the yoe Flash Wolves a place in the bracket stage. They were eventually knocked out of the tournament in the semifinals after losing to Team SoloMid.

With a second and third place LMS finish under their belt, the Flash Wolves had obtained a tie for the most LMS Championship Points behind AHQ, and were invited to the 2015 Taiwan Regional Finals. There, FW avenged their playoff loss by defeating Hong Kong Esports 3-2 and acquiring a spot in the 2015 Season World Championship.

At the World Championship, the FW were expected by many analysts to have one of the weakest showings of any team in attendance. However, after a 4-2 group stage with wins over favorites KOO Tigers and Counter Logic Gaming, the Flash Wolves emerged first from groups, becoming the first team in two years to finish ahead of a Korean team in groups at Worlds. In the tournament quarterfinals, FW lost 1–3 to Origen, earning a top eight finish.

Maple was one of the top players at the 2016 Mid-Season Invitational, in which Flash Wolves eventually finished third/fourth after losing to Counter Logic Gaming in the semi-finals.

Following a one-year spell with PSG Talon and a single split on Anyone's Legend, Maple signed with Team SoloMid as their new mid laner. The team finished 5-6th in playoffs following a chaotic split which saw the team make several changes during the season.

Tournament results

PSG Talon 

 2021 PCS Summer Split — 1st
 2021 Mid-Season Invitational — 3rd-4th
 2021 PCS Spring Split — 1st

Flash Wolves 
 2015 Intel Extreme Masters Season 9 Taipei — 1st
 2015 League of Legends World Championship — 5th–8th
 2016 Spring LMS — 1st
 2016 Mid-Season Invitational — 3rd–4th
 2016 Summer LMS — 1st
 2017 Intel Extreme Masters Season11 World Championship Katowice — 1st
 2017 Spring LMS — 1st
 2017 Summer LMS — 1st

References

External links 
 

Living people
1997 births
Flash Wolves players
Taiwanese esports players
League of Legends mid lane players
Esports players at the 2018 Asian Games